Massimo Maugeri is an Italian writer, journalist and radio presenter. He was born in Catania, Sicily in 1968.

Career
He contributes to the 'culture' section of magazines, newspapers and on Radio Polis. Maugeri is the managing editor of Letteratitudine, a blog that maintains a running commentary on contemporary Italian literature.

Publications

Novels 

 Identità distorte (Prova d'Autore, 2005 - Martoglio Prize)
 Trinacria Park (Edizioni e/o, 2013 - Vittorini Prize); 
 Cetti Curfino (La nave di Teseo, 2018).
 Il sangue della Montagna (La nave di Teseo, 2021).

Essays 

 "Letteratitudine, il libro - vol. I - 2006-2008" (Azimut, 2008); 
 "L’e-book è il futuro del libro" (Historica, 2011); 
 "Letteratitudine, il libro - vol. 2" (Historica, 2012); 
 "Letteratitudine 3: letture, scritture, metanarrazioni" (LiberAria, 2017);

Short stories 

 "La coda di pesce che inseguiva l’amore" (Sampognaro & Pupi, 2010 - "Più a Sud di Tunisi" Award 2011), with Simona Lo Iacono; 
 short stories collection "Viaggio all’alba del millennio" (Perdisa Pop, 2011 - Sebastiano Addamo International Prize);

References

1968 births
21st-century Italian novelists
Living people
Writers from Catania
Mass media people from Catania